Desertion is the abandonment of a duty or post in the military without permission.

Desertion may also refer to:

 Desertion (novel), by Abdulrazak Gurnah
 Mate desertion, a parent abandoning their offspring
 Spiritual desertion, the act of leaving a faith or religious group

See also 
 Desertification, a geological process
 Deserter (disambiguation)
 Abandonment (disambiguation)